The Seaside EP is a rarities release by Chicago artist Owen. It was released on July 7, 2009 by Polyvinyl Records digitally and as a CD (limited to 3,000 copies). The album was said to ship on June 26, 2009, but was sent out a week earlier as Polyvinyl received them. The EP's cover art was designed by UK illustrator David Blanco. The majority of songs can all be found on Japanese Owen releases, and the last track is from a compilation 2x7". It was re-released on vinyl on Record Store Day 2013.

Track listing

References

Owen (musician) EPs
2009 EPs
Polyvinyl Record Co. EPs